Admiral Christopher Alexander Barrie,  (born 29 May 1945) is a retired senior officer of the Royal Australian Navy, who served as Chief of the Defence Force from 4 July 1998 to 3 July 2002.

Early life
Barrie was born in the Sydney suburb of Marrickville, New South Wales, on 29 May 1945 to Alexander William Barrie and Dorothy Clare Chrystal. He was educated at North Sydney Boys High School, and entered the Royal Australian Naval College as a cadet midshipman in 1961.

Naval career
Postings to the Britannia Royal Naval College at Dartmouth and  followed.

In 1990 to 1991, Barrie held an appointment as Defence Adviser, New Delhi, India. He was appointed Deputy Maritime Commander and Chief of Staff at Maritime Headquarters in Sydney from 1992 to 1995, for which he was appointed a Member of the Order of Australia in 1994. On promotion to rear admiral, Barrie served as Deputy Chief of Naval Staff, before being appointed Vice Chief of the Defence Force with the rank of vice admiral in March 1997. The following year, Barrie was advanced to Officer of the Order of Australia in recognition of his "distinguished service" in the latter two postings.

Barrie was promoted to admiral, and assumed the post of Chief of the Defence Force (CDF) on 4 July 1998. He held this position until his retirement, and for his "eminent service to the Australian Defence Force" was further advanced to Companion of the Order of Australia in 2001 and awarded the Distinguished Service Order (Military) by the government of Singapore. As CDF, Barrie became involved in the "Children Overboard Affair" of 2001, a high-level political controversy which occurred during the Australian federal election campaign. Barrie was the last Australian Government official to publicly support Prime Minister John Howard's assertion that refugees had thrown their children overboard from their sinking vessel. Barrie retired on 3 July 2002, and was succeeded as CDF by General Peter Cosgrove.

A graduate of the Britannia Royal Naval College, Barrie completed through part-time study a Bachelor of Arts with majors in International Relations and Politics in 1983 and was conferred a Master of Business Administration in 1996 by Deakin University. He was made a Commander of the Legion of Merit by the United States in 2003.

References

External links
Vietnam War Nominal Roll entry
, accessed 23 August 2005.
Senior Military Appointments Government press release detailing the military appointments for 2000.

1945 births
Australian military personnel of the Indonesia–Malaysia confrontation
Australian military personnel of the Vietnam War
Chiefs of the Defence Force (Australia)
Commanders of the Legion of Merit
Companions of the Order of Australia
Deakin University alumni
Deputy Chiefs of Naval Staff (Australia)
Graduates of Britannia Royal Naval College
Living people
People educated at North Sydney Boys High School
People from Sydney
Recipients of the Centenary Medal
Recipients of the Darjah Utama Bakti Cemerlang (Tentera)
Royal Australian Navy admirals
Vice Chiefs of the Defence Force (Australia)
Military personnel from New South Wales